Elections were held in Zimbabwe on 31 July 2013 for the presidency and to set the membership of Parliament, consisting of the Senate and National Assembly. Robert Mugabe of the Zimbabwe African National Union – Patriotic Front (ZANU–PF) was reelected President with 61% of the vote against his main contender, Morgan Tsvangirai of the Movement for Democratic Change – Tsvangirai (MDC–T), who received 34%. ZANU–PF won large majorities in both houses of Parliament.

President

By province

Senate

By province
The follow table consists of the Senate results by province. The vote totals of the 210 constituency elections were used to allot the Senate seats proportionally. The 60 Senate seats were divided six per province, and were awarded via a party list system based on the proportion of the vote each party received in that province. When more than one candidate from the same party was running in a constituency, both their votes were included in the party total.

Elected seats 
The following Senate results are arranged by province.

Chiefs 
Eighteen seats in the Senate are reserved for traditional chiefs. Of these, sixteen are elected by the provincial assemblies of chiefs, with two chiefs representing each of the provinces—except the metropolitan provinces of Bulawayo and Harare. The remaining two seats are held by president and deputy president of the Zimbabwe Council of Chiefs.

Persons with disabilities 
Two seats in the Senate are reserved for persons with disabilities, one male and one female.

National Assembly

Constituency seats 
The following constituency results are arranged alphabetically by province.

Women's seats 
The sixty women's seats in the National Assembly were divided into six for each province. They were awarded based on the party's share of the vote received within a particular province, with the MP-elects chosen in descending order from party lists provided before the election. For the purposes of awarding these seats, the votes of multiple candidates from the same party running in the same constituency were pooled together to count the party totals, making the provincial vote counts for the awarding of these seats vary slightly from the official provincial vote totals. Successful candidates are indicated in bold. AKE provided a party list for Bulawayo Province, and ZAPU provided party lists for the provinces of Bulawayo, Matabeleland North, and Matabeleland South. However, the AKE and ZAPU did not receive enough votes to win any of the women's seats, and their party lists are not shown in the table below.

The following women's seats results are arranged by province.

See also 

 Constituency results of the 2008 Zimbabwean parliamentary election

References 
Presidential results

 ElectionGuide

Senate results

 ElectionGuide
 ZEC

National Assembly results

 Adam Carr
 Election Passport
 Kubatana
The Chronicle
 The Herald
 Nehanda Radio
 ZEC
Zimbabwean Government Gazette Extraordinary, 5 July 2013 (full list of candidates)
Zimbabwean Government Gazette, 9 August 2013 (full list of elected members)

Specific

2013 Zimbabwean general election
Election results in Zimbabwe
Zimbabwe politics-related lists